Compañeros is a 1970 Italian/Spanish/French international co-production Zapata Western buddy comedy film directed by Sergio Corbucci. The film stars Franco Nero, Tomas Milian, Jack Palance and Fernando Rey. The soundtrack for the film was written by Ennio Morricone.

Plot
During the Mexican Revolution, a peasant named El Vasco (Milian) starts a revolt in his town of San Bernardino by killing the army colonel in charge. Rebel leader and self-appointed General Mongo (Bódalo) soon arrives on the scene and hires El Vasco for his revolutionary gang. However, Mongo is more interested in gaining fortune for himself than for his country. Yodlaf Peterson (Nero), a Swedish mercenary arrives in Mexico to sell guns to General Mongo. The safe containing the money is locked and only Professor Xantos (Rey) knows the combination. Xantos is the leader of a student counter-revolution that opposes violence, and is held in a prison by the United States army just across the border in Yuma, after he tried to find funding from the US and did not agree to give the monopoly of his country's entire oil wealth in return.

El Vasco dislikes the suit-wearing Peterson and calls him a "penguin", but at the suggestion of General Mongo, the two reluctantly join forces and set out to capture Xantos. Their task is made harder by the American army and a wooden-armed American named John (Palance), who wants to exact revenge on Peterson, his former business partner. Peterson had left John to die after he was crucified, and his pet hawk had to peck his right hand off to save him. In order to maximize their personal gain and to support Xantos's rebel fighters, El Vasco and Peterson have to doublecross Mongo. They receive help from Lola (Berben), the leader of Xantos' rebel group, who El Vasco falls for, and her group of young revolutionaries.

After evading the Mexican army and crossing the border, El Vasco makes contact with a local prostitute he used to know who helps him and Peterson infiltrate the US Army camp and together the two men free Xantos by setting off a series of fires, and escape with Xantos in an old army truck, but the one of the truck's wheels becomes unhinged and the three men end up swimming across the Rio Grande river to safety back in Mexico. On foot, El Vasco, Peterson and Xantos encounter a Mexican army checkpoint and attempt to disguise themselves as robed monks carrying a coffin, with Xantos inside it, past the Mexican soldiers, but their cover is blown when John and his posse expose their identities forcing them to run with both the Mexican army and John's men in chase.

Eventually, El Vasco, Peterson and Xantos are safely reunited with Xantos' followers, known as the Xantistas, hiding out in a cave, led by Lola, who is revealed here to be Xantos' daughter. But Mongo captures several of the Xantistas and threatens to execute them if Xantos does not surrender. El Vasco and Peterson team up with Lola and the surviving Xantistas to launch a climatic attack on San Bernardino and they defeat Mongo's army in a climatic gun battle and Mongo himself is killed by El Vasco. Afterwards, when El Vasco brings Xantos to the bank vault to have him open the safe, the safe reveals to not hold any gold, silver or cash, only the "true wealth" of the community which include a few ears of corn.

As Peterson prepares to leave town, he decides to steal a valuable gold chalet from the local church, but El Vasco stops Peterson by challenging him to a duel. Just when Peterson and El Vasco are about to exchange gunfire at each other, Xantos tries to stop them but then John reappears and mortally wounds Xantos and prepares to kill El Vasco, only for Peterson to turn the tables on his enemy by throwing the gold chalet on a detonator switch which blows up the train car containing all of the arms and ammunition that Peterson arrived in, along with John. When news arrives that a large Federale counter-revolutionary army is marching onto San Bernardino, Peterson decides to leave aware that the Xantistas are outnumbered and outgunned, plus all of his arms and ammunition is gone, but El Vasco urges him to stay and fight. Peterson declines, for which he saddles and rides away on a horse. At the last minute, after seeing the huge Mexican army advancing in the distance and unwilling to allow the Xantistas be all killed by the Mexican army, Peterson rides back into town to join the revolutionaries in the imminent battle.

Cast
 Franco Nero as Yodlaf "Penguin" Peterson
 Tomas Milian as Modesto Servando Irureta Goyena ("El Vasco")
 Jack Palance as John
 Fernando Rey as Professor Vitaliano Xantos
 Iris Berben as Lola
 José Bódalo (as Francisco Bodalo) as General Mongo Álvarez 
 Eduardo Fajardo (as Edoardo Fajardo) as Colonel
 Karin Schubert as Zaira Harris
 Gino Pernice (as Luigi Pernice) as Tourneur
 Gérard Tichy as Lieutenant
 Álvaro de Luna as John's Henchman
 Tito García as Pepito Tigrero
 Lorenzo Robledo as Captain Jim

Release
Compañeros was released in Italy in December 1970. The film grossed a total of 1,451,782,000 Italian lire domestically in on its release in Italy. It was released in West Germany in 1971.

It was released by Blue Underground on Blu-ray in an edition that includes both the longer Italian 119 minute and edited 115 minute U.S. release versions.

References

Sources

External links
 
 Compañeros at Variety Distribution

1970 films
Films directed by Sergio Corbucci
Films shot in Madrid
Italian Western (genre) films
1970s Italian-language films
Spaghetti Western films
1970 Western (genre) films
Films scored by Ennio Morricone
Mexican Revolution films
Italian buddy films
Films shot in Almería
Films about mercenaries
1970s Italian films